Robert Francis, pen name for Jean Godmé, (1909–1946) was a French writer, winner of the 1934 edition of the Prix Femina.

Biography 
Robert Francis was Jean-Pierre Maxence's brother, the pseudonym of Pierre Godmé. After studying science, he occupied a post of civil engineer in the North of France in the 1930s. At the same time, he devoted himself to letters and founded with his brother in 1928 a literary magazine, Les Cahiers, which disappeared in 1931. Robert Francis belonged to the middle of the jeune droite catholique des années 1930 ("Young Catholic Right of the 1930s"). A friend of Thierry Maulnier, he wrote with him and his brother a work which had a certain success on its release: Demain la France ("Tomorrow France") which was a charge against the regime of the moment, written on the morrow of the 6 February 1934 crisis.

Work 
 Histoire d'une famille sous la Troisième République (suite romanesque) 
1933: (I) - La Grange aux trois belles, Paris, Librairie de la Revue française, Alexis Redier éd.
1934: (II) - La Chute de la maison de verre - La maison de verre, Librairie de la Revue française, Alexis Redier éd.
1934: (III) - La Chute de la maison de verre - Le Bateau-refuge, Paris, éditions Gallimard - Prix Fémina 1934
1935: (IV) - Les Mariés de Paris, Gallimard
1937: (V) - Le Gardien d’épaves, Gallimard

 Other publications 
1934: Demain la France, Paris, éditions Grasset, 1934, cowritten with Jean-Pierre Maxence and Thierry Maulnier
1936: Une vie d'enfant, Gallimard, (his first essay fiction, previously published in review)
1937: Un an de vacances, Gallimard
1938: La Jeune Fille secrète, Gallimard
1939: L'Oie, Gallimard
1941: Souvenirs imaginaires, Gallimard
1941: Histoire sainte (tales), Gallimard

References

External links 
 Robert Francis on Actualitté
 Robert Francis on Éditions Gallimard
 Robert Francis on Sartre devant la presse d’Occupation

20th-century French non-fiction writers
Prix Femina winners
1909 births
1946 deaths